is a Japanese voice actress and singer from Tokyo who has featured in a number of television series, video games, radio performances and music releases. She was previously represented with Just Production. She was a member of voice acting unit I My Me Mine by Asahi Production.

Biography
Her first starring role was in the 2015 television anime Onsen Yōsei Hakone-chan.

On 26 November 2016, on her Twitter account, she reported that she transferred to Just Production from Seinenza Theater Company Movie Broadcast. On 30 April 2019, she reported that she left Just Production.

Personal life
Ono is friends with Yūki Kuwahara and  comics artist and illustrator Norio Tsukudani. She is a big fan of Hiroshima Toyo Carptjjk.

Filmography
Bold denotes main characters.

TV anime
 2013

 2014

 2015

 2016

 2017

 2018

 2019

|Nori Pro
|| Ezomiya Milk ||
|}

Video games
 2013

 2014

 2015

 2016

 2017

 2022

Drama CD
 2014

 2017

Dubbing
 2021

Radio
Bold denotes it is currently broadcast. *Internet radio.

TV programmes

Stage

Discography

Character songs

Participating units
I My Me Mine – voice actress unit produced by Asahi Production.

 Former
Tartathan – Along with Ayano Kametaka, debuted on 21 March 2012. Disbanded on 6 July 2012.

References

Unit members

Sources

External links
 

1990 births
Living people
Japanese video game actresses
Japanese voice actresses
Voice actresses from Tokyo